Prostheclina is a genus of Australian jumping spiders that was first described by Eugen von Keyserling in 1882.

Species
Until 2007, only one species from this genus was known.  it contains seven species, found only in Australia:
Prostheclina amplior Richardson & Zabka, 2007 – Australia (Queensland to Tasmania)
Prostheclina basilonesa Richardson & Zabka, 2007 – Australia (Victoria, Tasmania)
Prostheclina boreoaitha Richardson & Zabka, 2007 – Australia (Queensland)
Prostheclina boreoxantha Richardson & Zabka, 2007 – Australia (Queensland)
Prostheclina bulburin Richardson & Zabka, 2007 – Australia (Queensland)
Prostheclina eungella Richardson & Zabka, 2007 – Australia (Queensland)
Prostheclina pallida Keyserling, 1882 (type) – Eastern Australia

References

Salticidae genera
Salticidae
Spiders of Australia
Taxa named by Eugen von Keyserling